Aimée Antoinette Camus (1 May 1879 – 17 April 1965) was a French botanist. She was best known for her study of orchids and oaks. Camus also has the legacy of authoring the second highest number of land plant species among female scientists, in total naming 677 species.

Camus was the daughter of Edmond Gustave Camus, also a botanist, and was born in L'Isle-Adam, about 50 kilometres north of Paris. Under her father's influence she specialized in the study of orchids and the anatomy of the plant and worked for some time with other professionals such as Paul Bergon (1863-1912) and Paul Henri Lecomte (1856-1934). Her sister was the painter Blanche-Augustine Camus (1881-1968). She also produced a major treatment of the oaks and stone oaks, providing the first comprehensive systematic treatment of the latter genus.

Camus published the work L'Iconographie des Orchidées d´Europe et du Bassin Méditerranéen.

She gave the name of Neohouzeaua to a genus of seven tropical bamboo, in honour of the lifelong work that Jean Houzeau de Lehaie had devoted to the understanding of the botany and propagation of bamboo in Europe and Africa.

References 

20th-century French botanists
Orchidologists
1879 births
1965 deaths
20th-century French women scientists
Agrostologists